No Wow is the second studio album by indie rock band The Kills. It was released February 21, 2005, on Domino Records. "Love Is a Deserter" was released as a single and obtained limited play on several music channels. "The Good Ones" was later released as a single and peaked at number 23 in the UK charts.

The song "No Wow" was used in the TV series Person of Interest, season 5, episode 1; "B.S.O.D." which aired on May 5, 2016. It was also used in the series The Good Wife, season 4, episode 20; "Rape: A Modern Perspective" which aired on April 14, 2013.

Track listing

European Bonus Disc

Love Is a Deserter single
 "Love Is a Deserter" [Single Version]
 "Passion Is Accurate"*
 "Love Is a Deserter" [Cavemen Remix]
 "Love Is a Deserter" [Phones 'Cardiac Unrest' Remix]
 "Love Is a Deserter" [Video]

The Good Ones single
 "The Good Ones" [Single Version]
 "Run Home Slow"*
 "The Good Ones" [Jagz Kooner Mix]
 "Baby's Eyes"*

* Previously unreleased B-sides.

Chart performance

References

2005 albums
Albums produced by Jamie Hince
Domino Recording Company albums
The Kills albums